Computer Communications Network was a company founded in 1968 by brothers Edward and Robert Eskine in Nashville, Tennessee. The core of its employees came from UNIVAC and Burroughs Corporation. CCN was one of the first companies to use telecommunications for small business purposes. CCN used UNIVAC model 494 computers and Burroughs model TC 500 computers.  They also created software for wholesale beverage distribution, hospitals, and airline reservations.

Burroughs TC (terminal computer) 500's were used at the customer level and connected to the Univac 494 mainframes located at data centers in Nashville and Atlanta using dedicated phone lines. This system gave small businesses online, real-time access to the type of data processing that in the past only companies with large mainframes and very large budgets could afford.

Telecommunications companies of the United States
Companies based in Nashville, Tennessee